Birchy may refer to:

 Birchy Bay, Newfoundland and Labrador
 Birchy Cove, settlement in Newfoundland and Labrador
 Birchy, alternate name of Birchville, California